Globalisation is Good is a 2003 documentary film written and presented by Johan Norberg and produced by Freeform Productions for British Channel 4. The film, directed by Charlotte Metcalf, is based on Norberg's much celebrated book In Defense of Global Capitalism (published in 2001) that shows his view of the impact of globalisation, and the consequences of its absence. In the film, Norberg travels to countries like Taiwan, Vietnam and Kenya promoting ideas of global capitalism and attempting to prove why he feels protestors entering the anti-globalisation movement are ignorant and dangerously wrong.

The film was released on DVD in November 2006 by the Swedish think tank Timbro.

External links

 The film at Youtube.com
 Electric Sky - Globalisation is Good
 JohanNorberg.Net - Globalisation is Good

2003 television films
2003 films
Documentary films about globalization
2003 documentary films
British documentary films
Films based on non-fiction books
2000s English-language films
2000s British films